The Thaler (German) or taler (Polish) was the currency of Danzig (Gdańsk) until 1772 and again from 1807 to 1814. It was subdivided into 4 Gulden (złotych, sg. złoty), each of 30 Groschen (groszy, sg. grosz) or 90 Schilling (solidus). In both 1772 and 1814, the currency was replaced by the Prussian Thaler.

Modern obsolete currencies
Currencies of Poland
History of Gdańsk
1814 disestablishments in Europe